Katie True (born January 16, 1941) is an American Republican politician, and former member of the Pennsylvania House of Representatives.

True was born in Baltimore, Maryland but moved to Lancaster County, Pennsylvania as a youth.  She is a graduate of J. P. McCaskey High School.

True began her career in public service when she founded Kids Saving Kids, a nationally recognized drug-education program for elementary students. She was a Member of the National Federation of Parents for Drug Free Youth and served as Youth Director for Pennsylvanians AWARE, a statewide drug and alcohol prevention coalition.

Her work in the community combined with service as a Republican Committee woman eventually led to a political career. True was first elected to represent the 37th district in the Pennsylvania House of Representatives in 1992. She served in that position until 2000, when she left the House to run for Pennsylvania Auditor General. She lost that election to Bob Casey, Jr.

After her defeat in 2000, True served as the Executive Director of the Pennsylvania Commission for Women under Governor Tom Ridge.

In the 2002 election, True was elected to represent the 41st legislative district in the Pennsylvania House of Representatives. She retired prior to the 2010 election.

On April 4, 2011, Governor Tom Corbett named True to lead the Bureau of Professional and Occupational Affairs within the Pennsylvania Department of State. As commissioner, True will oversee the state’s professional and occupational hearing boards. The bureau provides administrative and legal support for all of the state’s licensing boards - which oversees professionals from medical doctors to accountants and funeral directors – while protecting the health, safety and welfare of the public from fraudulent and unethical practitioners.

References

External links

Follow the Money - Katie True
2008 2006 2004 2002 1998 House campaign contributions
2000 Auditor campaign contributions

1941 births
Living people
Republican Party members of the Pennsylvania House of Representatives
Politicians from Baltimore
People from Lancaster County, Pennsylvania
Women state legislators in Pennsylvania
20th-century American women politicians
21st-century American women politicians
21st-century American politicians
20th-century American politicians